"Gypsy" is the debut single by British progressive rock/hard rock band Uriah Heep. It is the opening track on their first album, …Very 'Eavy …Very 'Umble, released in 1970. "Gypsy" was written by Mick Box and David Byron. The B-side of the song in most countries was "Bird of Prey", though in others, the B-sides were "Wake Up (Set Your Sights)", "Come Away Melinda" and "Lady in Black". The album version of "Gypsy" lasts more than six and half minutes, while the single version lasts less than three minutes. The song was also included on the band's first compilation album, The Best of Uriah Heep, and on two live albums, 1973's Uriah Heep Live and the later Live in Armenia. The song is structured with an intro, outro and three verses with no chorus, and uses only four chords: Cm, G#, G and C#-C.

Covers
The song was covered by American noise rock band godheadSilo in 1996, appearing on their self-titled GodheadSilo 7-inch EP.

Personnel
 Mick Box – lead and acoustic guitars
 David Byron – lead vocals
 Ken Hensley – piano, organ
 Paul Newton – bass guitar
 Alex Napier – drums

Charts

References

Uriah Heep (band) songs
1970 debut singles
Songs written by Mick Box
Songs written by David Byron
1970 songs